Austwell-Tivoli Independent School District is a public school district based in the community of Tivoli, Texas (USA).  In addition to Tivoli, the district also serves the city of Austwell and rural areas in eastern Refugio County.

Finances
As of the 2010–2011 school year, the appraised valuation of property in the district was $444,677,000. The maintenance tax rate was $0.104 and the bond tax rate was $0.002 per $100 of appraised valuation.

Academic achievement
In 2011, the school district was rated "recognized" by the Texas Education Agency.  Thirty-five percent of districts in Texas in 2011 received the same rating. No state accountability ratings will be given to districts in 2012. A school district in Texas can receive one of four possible rankings from the Texas Education Agency: Exemplary (the highest possible ranking), Recognized, Academically Acceptable, and Academically Unacceptable (the lowest possible ranking).

Historical district TEA accountability ratings
2011: Recognized
2010: Exemplary
2009: Recognized
2008: Recognized
2007: Academically Acceptable
2006: Academically Acceptable
2005: Academically Acceptable
2004: Academically Acceptable

Schools
Austwell-Tivoli High School (Grades 7-12)
Austwell-Tivoli Elementary School (Grades PK-6)

Athletics
Austwell-Tivoli High School does not participate in football, but participates (for the 2014-2016 realignment cycle) in the following sports as a member of UIL Class A: basketball, cross country, tennis, track, volleyball (the latter as a girl's sport only) and golf.

See also

List of school districts in Texas
List of high schools in Texas

References

External links
 

School districts in Refugio County, Texas